Björn Rehnquist (born January 5, 1978 in Borås, Sweden) is a professional Swedish tennis player.

Tennis career

Juniors
Rehnquist had an outstanding junior career, winning the Australian Open Boys' Singles in 1996 and reaching as high as No. 3 in the world in singles the same year (and No. 7 in doubles).

Junior Grand Slam finals

Singles: 2 (1 title, 1 runner-up)

Australian Open: W (1996)
French Open: F (1996)
Wimbledon: 3R (1995)
US Open: QF (1994)

Pro tour
The Swede competed in the 2006 Australian Open, losing to 20th seed Radek Štěpánek 6–1, 6–2, 6–2, and at the 2009 Australian Open, but lost in the first round 6–0, 6–2, 6–2 to eventual semi-finalist Andy Roddick.

Rehnquist won 5 Challenger titles in his career.

ATP Challenger and ITF Futures finals

Singles: 15 (8–7)

Doubles: 7 (6–1)

Performance timeline

Singles

References

External links
 
 

Australian Open (tennis) junior champions
People from Borås
Sportspeople from Gothenburg
Swedish male tennis players
Living people
1978 births
Grand Slam (tennis) champions in boys' singles